Acristatherium yanensis is an extinct basal eutherian from the Early Cretaceous (early Aptian, about ) Lujiatun Bed of the Yixian Formation. It was described on the basis of a single specimen (holotype) from Beipiao, Liaoning, China, by Yaoming Hu, Jin Meng, Chuankui Li, and Yuanqing Wang in 2010. It appears to possess a vestige of a septomaxilla, a feature only otherwise seen in nonmammalian therapsids.

References

Prehistoric eutherians
Early Cretaceous mammals of Asia
Fossil taxa described in 2010
Prehistoric mammal genera